Robert Hunter MacGimsey (1898 – 1979) was an American composer.  His most famous song was "Sweet Little Jesus Boy" (1934), a well-known Christmas carol written in the style of an African-American spiritual.

Early years 
Born Robert Hunter MacGimsey in Pineville, Louisiana, of white parents,  MacGimsey spent most of his formative years in the company of blacks who lived with and worked for and with his family. Due to their influence he wrote in an "African American" style,. and he is often mistakenly assumed to be a black composer.

When he was young, MacGimsey sang in the church choir that his mother directed. She ensured that he received training in music, eventually studying under Frank Damrosch at the Institute of Musical Art in New York.

Law and politics 
Before he became known for his musical accomplishments, MacGimsey was an attorney in Lake Providence, Louisiana, in addition to being an adviser to United States Senator Joseph E. Ransdell from Louisiana. In 1960, MacGimsey said that he was giving up music to dedicate the remainder of his life to good government.

Whistling 
MacGimsey was also famous for double whistling, or whistling duets.

Composing 
MacGimsey is also known for the song "How Do You Do?" which was originally written for the Walt Disney live-action musical drama Song of the South. The song is also featured in the theme-park attraction Splash Mountain located in Disneyland, Walt Disney World, and Tokyo Disneyland. MacGimsey also composed "Shadrack," which was a 1962 hit for Brook Benton that was also recorded by Louis Armstrong and many others. In 1947, Robert Merrill recorded a disc (Victor 10-1303) with MacGimsey's songs ("Sweet Little Jesus Boy" and "To My Mother") on both sides.

MacGimsey worked with singer John Gary, beginning with their first meeting after Gary had left the Marines. Gary made a demonstration record with four new songs by MacGimsey, and a friendship developed thereafter.

Papers 
MacGimsey's library, letters and works can be found in the library archives at Louisiana College, Pineville, Louisiana.

References

External links
List of recordings of Robert MacGimsey songs at Allmusic.com ([ link 1], [ link 2])
List of Robert MacGimsey songs at ASCAP.com (link)

American male composers
1898 births
1979 deaths
20th-century American composers
20th-century American male musicians